The Beatson Institute for Cancer Research (also known as the Cancer Research UK Beatson Institute) is a biological research facility that conducts research into the basic biology of cancer. It is based in Glasgow, Scotland.

The Institute is named in recognition of Sir George Beatson, a surgeon, who in 1912 established a research department in the cancer hospital in Glasgow.  This department became independent from the hospital in 1967 when the Institute was founded by the then Director, Dr John Paul. Dr Paul raised sufficient funds to move the Beatson in 1976 to its present location on the Garscube Estate, where it has since interacted closely with researchers at the University of Glasgow. The Institute moved in 2008 to a new research building built by Reiach and Hall Architects.

Professor John Wyke became Director in 1987, Professor Karen Vousden in 2002 and Professor Owen Sansom in 2017.

Research groups at the Beatson Institute study cancer initiation, metabolism and metastasis. The Institute holds an annual meeting, the Beatson International Cancer Conference, focused on one of these topics.

Notable present and former scientists and physicians 
 Professor Allan Balmain, FRSE
 Professor Margaret Frame, OBE, FRSE
 Dr John Paul
 Professor Owen Sansom, FRSE, FMedSci
 Professor Karen Vousden, CBE, FRS, FRSE
 Professor Paul Workman

See also 
 Cancer in the United Kingdom

References

External links 

1912 establishments in Scotland
Organizations established in 1912
Research in Scotland
Cancer organisations based in the United Kingdom
University of Glasgow
Charities based in Glasgow
Companies based in Glasgow